Gagea bohemica, the early star-of-Bethlehem or Radnor lily, is a European and Mediterranean species of flowering plant in the lily family. It is sometimes referred to as the Welsh Star-of-Bethlehem.

Gagea bohemica is widespread across and central and southern Europe as well as in northern Africa and the Middle East. Its range stretches from the United Kingdom to Morocco to Lebanon to Ukraine.  Within the UK, specimens have been discovered at a single site in the Welsh county of Radnorshire, the only location in the United Kingdom from which it has been reported, and the plant has been adopted as the county flower.

As its name suggests, the Early Star-of-Bethlehem blooms earlier than most other species of Gagea, and is usually found in flower from January to March or April. Its flowers are very similar to those of the Yellow Star-of-Bethlehem. This belongs to the same genus  but it is a less vigorous plant, growing to a height of 2–6 cm and normally having just a single pair of twisting, thread-like basal leaves, with one or two pairs of lanceolate leaves, perhaps 1 cm wide, just below the flowers. The flowers, of which there are usually no more than four on each plant, are yellow and have six petals; they are about 1½ cm in diameter. It grows mainly on dry grassland.

References

External links
British Wild Plant: Gagea bohemica Radnor Lily  photos plus locality info of Welsh populations
First Nature, Gagea bohemica - Radnor Lily - Early Star-of-Bethlehem - (Liliaceae) 
Czech Botany, Gagea bohemica, Early Star-of-Bethlehem in English, with photos
Tela Botanica  in French with photos, distribution maps, etc.

bohemica
Plants described in 1776
Flora of Europe